Paul Yanover (born c. 1967) is a Canadian business executive. He has been the president of Fandango Media, an American ticketing company, since 2012. Before Fandango, Yanover spent 16 years working for The Walt Disney Company.

Early life and education 
Paul Yanover grew up in Ontario, Canada. He received bachelor's degrees in computer science and economics from the University of Western Ontario, and an MS in computer science from the University of Southern California.

Career 
Yanover began his career at Walt Disney Feature Animation in 1991, where he developed software and tools for animators. He worked on several films, including Aladdin and Beauty and the Beast.

In 1999, Yanover left Disney and co-founded Ceiva Logic, a consumer electronics company. He returned to the Walt Disney Company three years later, and worked on the Walt Disney Parks and Resorts Online team. In 2006, Yanover was named executive vice president and managing director of Disney Online.

From February 2011 to September 2012, Yanover was the president of Lookout Interactive Media.

In October 2012, he was named president of Fandango, a ticketing company founded in 2000. Since becoming president, Yanover has expanded the company through acquisitions, including Movieclips in 2014 and Rotten Tomatoes, a media review site, in 2016.

Fandango 
At Fandango, Yanover has focussed on creating Web series and original content. As of 2015, Fandango produced seven online video series. In 2015, Yanover oversaw the creation of FandangoLab, a division that creates product ideas.

Under Yanover, Fandango launched FandangoNOW, an online platform for movies, in 2016. In 2018, Yanover helped establish new policies at Rotten Tomatoes, including updated criteria for critics and allowing reviews of other forms of media, including podcasts. That same year, Fandango expanded its international presence under Yanover through deals with Cinepolis, Cinemark, National Amusements, and Cinemex, all based in Latin and Central American countries.

Personal life
Yanover is married with two daughters (born c. 2000), and lives in Laurel Canyon, Los Angeles.

References 

Business executives
Businesspeople from Ontario
Year of birth missing (living people)
Living people